, literally "Cherry Blossoms, Let's eat together", is the third single by the Japanese idol group HKT48, released on March 12, 2014. It reached number one on the Oricon and Billboard Japan weekly singles chart. It was the 19th best-selling single of the year in Japan, with 327,815 copies.

Promotion and release 
"Sakura, Minnade Tabeta" was released in Japan on March 12, 2014 in four different versions: Type A, Type B, Type C and the Theater.

The centers for the title track were announced to be Meru Tashima and Mio Tomonaga, both same as the previous single "Melon Juice". The title track would also feature a new member whose promotion have been announced in January: Miku Tanaka, and Nako Yabuki, who was featured as the center in "Wink wa 3kai", an HKT48 song recorded on AKB48's CD, as well as Chiyori Nakanishi, who was one of Senbatsu members in the 1st single but not chosen for the 2nd.

The B-side songs recorded on Type A and B versions are sung by Team H members and KIV members, both members were based on the announcement made at the HKT48's concert in Oita on January 11, 2014.

Track listing

Type-A

Type-B

Type-C

Theater Edition

Personnel

"Sakura, Minnade Tabeta" 
The centers for the title track are Meru Tashima and Mio Tomonaga.
 Team H : Yuka Akiyoshi, Chihiro Anai, Haruka Kodama, Natsumi Matsuoka,  Chiyori Nakanishi, Rino Sashihara, Meru Tashima
 Team KIV : Mai Fuchigami, Sakura Miyawaki, Madoka Moriyasu, Aoi Motomura, Anna Murashige, Aika Ota, Mio Tomonaga
 Kenkyuusei : Miku Tanaka, Nako Yabuki

"Kimiwa Doushite?" 
 Team H : Yuka Akiyoshi, Chihiro Anai, Haruka Kodama, Natsumi Matsuoka,  Chiyori Nakanishi, Rino Sashihara, Meru Tashima
 Team KIV : Mai Fuchigami, Sakura Miyawaki, Madoka Moriyasu, Aoi Motomura, Anna Murashige, Aika Ota, Mio Tomonaga
 Kenkyuusei : Miku Tanaka, Nako Yabuki

"Kidoku Through" 
Center : Meru Tashima
 Team H: Yuka Akiyoshi, Chihiro Anai, Yuriya Inoue, Haruka Kodama, Yui Kōjina, Hiroka Kodama, Natsumi Matsuoka, Chiyori Nakanishi, Naoko Okamoto, Riko Sakaguchi, Rino Sashihara, Natsumi Tanaka, Meru Tashima, Izumi Umemoto, Haruka Wakatabe, Marina Yamada

"Mukashino Kareshino Onīchanto Tsukiauto Iukoto" 
Center : Mio Tomonaga
 Team KIV : Mai Fuchigami, Izumi Gotō, Mina Imada, Serina Kumazawa, Sakura Miyawaki, Madoka Moriyasu, Aoi Motomura, Anna Murashige, Kanna Okada, Aika Ota, Yuki Shimono, Yūka Tanaka, Marika Tani, Asuka Tomiyoshi, Mio Tomonaga, Nao Ueki

"Oboete Kudasai" 
 Trainees: Maiko Fukagawa, Shino Iwahana, Manami Kusaba, Haruka Ueno, Mashiro Ui
 3rd-generation trainees: Misaki Aramaki, Hazuki Hokazono, Sae Kurihara, Erena Sakamoto, Miku Tanaka, Riko Tsutsui, Nako Yabuki, Emiri Yamashita, Yuuna Yamauchi

"Kimino Kotoga Sukiyaken 
 Team H : Yuka Akiyoshi, Chihiro Anai, Haruka Kodama, Natsumi Matsuoka,  Chiyori Nakanishi, Rino Sashihara, Meru Tashima
 Team KIV : Mai Fuchigami, Sakura Miyawaki, Madoka Moriyasu, Aoi Motomura, Anna Murashige, Aika Ota, Mio Tomonaga
 Kenkyuusei : Miku Tanaka, Nako Yabuki

Oricon Charts

References 

2014 singles
Japanese-language songs
HKT48 songs
Oricon Weekly number-one singles
2014 songs
Songs about cherry blossom